Károly Aggházy  (30 October 1855, Budapest – 8 October 1918, Budapest) was a Hungarian piano virtuoso and composer.

Aggházy was a pupil of Robert Volkmann, Anton Bruckner, and Franz Liszt. He later taught at the National Conservatory in Budapest. Besides several operas, most notably Maritta (1895), he chiefly wrote chamber music and pieces for piano. he died in Budapest at age 62

Discography 
 2021: Acte Préalable AP0511 – Károly Aggházy  - Works for Piano (Sławomir P. Dobrzański)

References

Entry in the Magyar Életrajzi Lexikon

External links 

 List of operas by Aggházy

1855 births
1918 deaths
19th-century classical composers
19th-century classical pianists
19th-century Hungarian people
19th-century Hungarian male musicians
20th-century classical composers
20th-century classical pianists
20th-century Hungarian people
20th-century Hungarian male musicians
Hungarian Romantic composers
Hungarian classical composers
Hungarian classical pianists
Hungarian male classical composers
Hungarian opera composers
Male opera composers
Male classical pianists
Musicians from Budapest